Kumari Thankam was an Indian actress who acted in Malayalam cinema. She was a lead actress during the late 1950s and 1960s in Malayalam. She made her debut in Aathmasakhi in 1952. She acted in more than 50 movies.

Personal life
Kumari came from  Poojapura, Thiruvananthapuram. She was married to a brother of Lalitha-Padmini-Ragini trio, producer P. K. Sathyapal and they had three children, late S. Padmanabhan, late S. Jayapal and Asha. She died on 8 March 2011 at Shenoy Nagar, Chennai.

Filmography

As an actress
 Madhuram Thirumaduram (1976)
 Moodal Manju (1970)
 Achanum Makanum (1957)
 Deva Sundari (1957)
 Jailppulli (1957) .... Sudha
 Koodappirappu (1956)
 Minnunnathellam Ponnalla (1956)
 Manthravaadi (1956)
 Aniyathi (1955) ... Jayanthy
 C.I.D. (1955)
 Avan Varunnu (1954)
 Baalyasakhi (1954)
 Ponkathir (1953)
 Lokaneethi (1953)
 Thiramala (1953)
 Visappinte Vili (1952)
 Aathmasakhi (1952)

As a singer
 Vannaalum Mohanane ... Minnunnathellaam Ponnalla (1957)

References

External links
 Kumari Thankam at MSI

Actresses in Malayalam cinema
Indian film actresses
Actresses from Thiruvananthapuram
Year of birth missing
2011 deaths
20th-century Indian actresses
Singers from Thiruvananthapuram
20th-century Indian singers
Malayalam playback singers
Indian women playback singers
20th-century Indian women singers
Film musicians from Kerala
Women musicians from Kerala